Beside Myself may refer to:

Music
"Beside Myself", a song by Art Farmer from The Company I Keep
"Beside Myself", a song by Earshot from The Silver Lining
"Beside Myself", a song by Jethro Tull from Roots to Branches
"Beside Myself", a song by Lower Than Atlantis from World Record
"Beside Myself", a song by Don McLean from Addicted to Black
Beside Myself (Ray Stevens album), a 1989 album by Ray Stevens
Beside Myself (Basement album), a 2018 album by Basement